Peddie may refer to:

Surname:
Dr Alexander Peddie, Scottish physician
Bruce Peddie, American college baseball coach
Jack Peddie (1876–1928), Scottish football player who played for various clubs in both England and Scotland
James Peddie, Baron Peddie, MBE (1905–1978), British businessman and politician
John Dick Peddie (1824–1891), Scottish architect and Liberal MP for Kilmarnock Burghs
John More Dick Peddie (1853–1921), Scottish architect
John Ronald Peddie (1887–1979) Scottish administrator
Richard Peddie, President and CEO of Maple Leafs Sports and Entertainment
Thomas Baldwin Peddie (1808–1889), American Republican politician
Timm Peddie, retired professional track and road bicycle racer from the United States
William Peddie (1861–1946), Scottish physicist

Geography:

Peddie, Eastern Cape, town in South Africa
Mount Peddie, isolated mountain north of Webster Bluff at the north end of the Ford Ranges in Marie Byrd Land

Other:
First Baptist Peddie Memorial Church, historic church at Broad and Fulton Streets in Newark, New Jersey
Peddie School, college preparatory school in Hightstown, New Jersey, United States

See also
Peddiea
Pedetidae
Piedade (disambiguation)